WBAL (1090 kHz) is a commercial AM radio station licensed to Baltimore, Maryland, and owned by the broadcasting division of Hearst Communications. Airing a news/talk radio format, WBAL broadcasts on a Class A clear-channel frequency, with 50,000 watts from a transmitter facility in Randallstown, Maryland.  Listeners in and around Baltimore can also hear the station on FM translator station W268BA at 101.5 MHz.

The station shares its studios and offices with sister stations WBAL-TV (channel 11) and WIYY (97.9 FM) on Television Hill in Baltimore's Woodberry neighborhood. WBAL and WIYY are the only two radio stations owned by Hearst, which is primarily a publishing and television company.

WBAL is non-directional by day but uses a directional antenna at night to protect the other Class A stations on 1090 AM, KAAY in Little Rock and XEPRS in Rosarito, Mexico. With a good radio, WBAL's nighttime signal can be heard in much of Eastern North America, reaching as far as Nova Scotia and Bermuda. Its daytime signal easily covers most of Maryland as well as the Washington metropolitan area, and parts of Delaware, Virginia and Pennsylvania.  WBAL is Maryland's designated primary entry point for the Emergency Alert System.

Programming
On weekdays, WBAL airs several local talk shows, including Clarence M. Mitchell, IV (known as "C4") and Bryan Nehman, as well as a program hosted by Kim Klacek and Torrey Snow. Sports programming is heard as well. Several WBAL-TV newscasts are simulcast.

Weekends include a mix of local shows and syndicated programs, including Dana Loesch, Meet The Press, This Week from ABC and Bill Cunningham.  Some weekend hours are paid brokered programming.  WBAL carries national news from ABC News.

Sports
WBAL is the co-flagship station with WIYY for Baltimore Orioles baseball, Baltimore Ravens football, and United States Naval Academy college football.

Since the Baltimore Orioles began their inaugural season in 1954, WBAL was their flagship station for most of that team's history, though not continuously.  For example, it carried Orioles games every season from 1987 to 2006, after which the team's games were broadcast on crosstown sports radio station WJZ-FM.  Orioles games returned to WBAL from 2011 to 2014 before the team switched back to WJZ-FM in 2015. On January 5, 2022, it was announced that the Orioles would be returning to WBAL along with sister station WIYY beginning with the 2022 season. The games are also streamed on the respective stations' websites and apps, but with MLB-required georestrictions limiting the broadcast to the entire states of Virginia, Maryland, Delaware, and Washington DC, the Pennsylvania counties of York, Harrisburg and Lancaster, the West Virginia counties of Grant, Hardy, Mineral, Hampshire, Morgan, Berkeley and Jefferson, and most of North Carolina excluding Asheville (which is in the Braves' broadcast territory). Ravens games have been broadcast on WBAL and WIYY since the 2006 season.

Other teams whose games have been broadcast on WBAL include the Baltimore Colts, the University of Maryland Terrapins and the Towson Tigers.

History

Consolidated Gas Electric
WBAL began broadcasting after being dedicated on November 2, 1925. It was a subsidiary of the Consolidated Gas Electric Light and Power Company, a predecessor of Constellation Energy.  The initial broadcasting studio was located at the utility's offices on Lexington Street.  

WBAL was an affiliate of the NBC Blue Network. On January 12, 1935, with radio becoming more commercialized, there was little justification for a public service company to own a radio station.  WBAL was sold to the Hearst-controlled American Radio News Corporation, which operated it along with two daily newspapers, The Baltimore News-Post and The Baltimore American (later merged as the Baltimore News-American).

MOR and Talk
In the 1930s, WBAL became the flagship station for the international broadcast of radio evangelist G. E. Lowman, whose shows originated in Baltimore until 1959.  As network programming moved from radio to television in the 1950, WBAL switched to a full service, middle of the road (MOR) music format stressing personality and news.  The station played a mix of standards with some softer songs from the Top 40.

By the early 1970s, the station had a full-service adult contemporary music format with the exception of weekday evenings, where the station aired talk programming.

Among its personalities during that period were program host Jay Grayson, Harley Brinsfield, who had a long-running Saturday night jazz music program, The Harley Show, and White House-accredited newsman Galen Fromme. In the early 1980s, WBAL began running talk shows evenings and overnights, and continued to play some music during the day.

News-Talk
Music gradually decreased and talk programs were added.  In the fall of 1985, WBAL transitioned to its current news-talk format, winning 19 national Edward R. Murrow Awards since then, the most of any local U.S. radio station.  Since the mid-1990s, the station has become increasingly conservative, both in its on-air personalities and its editorial direction.

In 2010, WBAL switched its morning and afternoon drive time shows to an all-news format, titled Maryland's Morning News and Afternoon News Journal respectively. The shows were renamed to Maryland's News Now and later to "WBAL News Now."  The all-news blocks included national newscasts from ABC News every 30 minutes.  Previously, the national feed had been provided by CBS at the top of each hour until 2014.  Also in 2014, the station was re-branded as WBAL News Radio 1090, to better reflect its status as Maryland's radio news leader.  By the 2020s, the news blocks had been scaled back, with talk shows taking their place.

HD Radio and Translator
In addition to its analog 1090 kHz signal, WBAL is also heard on 97.9 WIYY-HD2.  In 2021, the station added an FM translator at 101.5 MHz, W268BA, so the station could be heard on FM radios in and around Baltimore.

Anchors, reporters, and hosts

 Bill Vanko
 Bryan Nehman (morning anchor) 
 Steve Fermier
 Dan Joseph (evening host)
 Yuripzi Morgan (afternoon host)
 Anne Kramer 
 Robert Lang (anchor & public affairs host)
 Clarence M. Mitchell, IV (C4)
 Jimmy Mathis
 Doug McIntyre
 Jim Russ (traffic reporter)
 Dana Loesch
 Scott Wykoff (morning reporter) 
 Phil Yacuboski
 Troy Johnson
 Liz Drabick (traffic reporter)
 Stacy Lyn
 Brenda Carl
 Dave Gegorak
 Jacob Young
 Kristie McIntyre
 Bill Cunningham

Notable former on-air staff
 Ron Smith – died, at the age of 70, on December 19, 2011, after a brief battle with pancreatic cancer.
 Allan Prell - Along with Smith, the leading voice of WBAL in the 1980s and 90s.  Left the station in 1999, died in 2016.
 Dave Durian - hosted the morning show from 1990 to 2012; died at age 72 on January 28, 2019, from complications of lung cancer and a stroke.
 "Detour Dave" Sandler - longtime traffic reporter, died in 2019.
 Dick Purtan - disc jockey and talk host, 1967-68. Originally from Buffalo, New York, he was in Detroit in 1965, then to Baltimore for a year. Returned to Detroit in 1968, ended career there in 2010.
 John V. Patti - Retired from WBAL after 38 years in 2022.
 Jim Russ, traffic reporter, died suddenly from cardiac arrest on August 18, 2021. His reporting career spanned 38 years in the Washington, D.C and Baltimore area.

References

External links
WBAL website

 Isaacs, Stan. "The Orioles Play Stop The Music," Sports Illustrated, October 8, 1979.
 FCC History Cards for WBAL

News and talk radio stations in the United States
BAL (AM)
Randallstown, Maryland
Woodberry, Baltimore
Hearst Communications assets
Clear-channel radio stations
Radio stations established in 1925
1925 establishments in Maryland